Lords of the Land: The War for Israel's Settlements in the Occupied Territories, 1967-2007
by Idith Zertal and Akiva Eldar is a book explaining how Israel is changing the current demographic formula at the occupied territories through building more settlements on the lands of the occupied territories and forcing Palestinians to move away. It was first published in Hebrew by Dvir publishing house, Israel, 2005 as אדוני הארץ : המתנחלים ומדינת ישראל,? 1967-2004 /
Adone ha-arets : ha-mitnaḥalim u-medinat Yiśraʼel, 1967-2004  It was and translated into English by Vivian Eden, and published by The Nation Books, and reviewed in the New York Review of Books,   the New York Times, and the London Review of Books  It is held in over 400 libraries, according to WorldCat.

References

Israeli–Palestinian conflict books